A necktie, or simply a tie, is a piece of cloth worn for decorative purposes around the neck, resting under the shirt collar and knotted at the throat, and often draped down the chest.

Variants include the ascot, bow, bolo, zipper tie, cravat, and knit. The modern necktie, ascot, and bow tie are descended from the cravat. Neckties are generally unsized but may be available in a longer size. In some cultures, men and boys wear neckties as part of office attire or formal wear. Women wear them less often. Neckties can also be part of a uniform. Neckties are traditionally worn with the top shirt button fastened, and the tie knot resting between the collar points.

History

Origins 

The necktie that spread from Europe traces back to Croatian mercenaries serving in France during the Thirty Years' War (1618–1648). These mercenaries from the Military Frontier, wearing their traditional small, knotted neckerchiefs, aroused the interest of the Parisians. Because of the difference between the Croatian word for Croats, and the French word, the garment gained the name cravat ( in French).  Louis XIV began wearing a lace cravat around 1646 when he was seven and set the fashion for French nobility. This new article of clothing started a fashion craze in Europe; both men and women wore pieces of fabric around their necks. From its introduction by the French king, men wore lace cravats, or jabots, which took a large amount of time and effort to arrange. These cravats were often tied in place by cravat strings, arranged neatly and tied in a bow.

International Necktie Day is celebrated on October 18 in Croatia and in various cities around the world, including in Dublin, Tübingen, Como, Tokyo, Sydney and other towns.

1710–1800: stocks, solitaires, neckcloths, cravats 

In 1715, another kind of neckwear, called "stocks" made its appearance. The term originally referred to a leather collar, laced at the back, worn by soldiers to promote holding the head high in a military bearing.  The leather stock also afforded some protection to the major blood vessels of the neck from saber or bayonet attacks.  General Sherman is seen wearing a leather stock in several American Civil War-era photographs.

Stock ties were initially just a small piece of muslin folded into a narrow band wound a few times around the shirt collar and secured from behind with a pin.  It was fashionable for men to wear their hair long, past shoulder length. The ends were tucked into a black silk bag worn at the nape of the neck. This was known as the bag-wig hairstyle, and the neckwear worn with it was the stock.

The solitaire was a variation of the bag wig. This form had matching ribbons stitched around the bag. After the stock was in place, the ribbons would be brought forward and tied in a large bow in front of the wearer.

Sometime in the late 18th century, cravats began to make an appearance again. This can be attributed to a group of young men called the macaronis (as mentioned in the song "Yankee Doodle"). These were young Englishmen who returned from Europe and brought with them new ideas about fashion from Italy. The French contemporaries of the macaronis were the 'petits-maîtres' and incroyables.

1800–1850: cravat, stocks, scarves, bandanas 

At this time, there was also much interest in the way to tie a proper cravat and this led to a series of publications. This began in 1818 with the publication of Neckclothitania, a style manual that contained illustrated instructions on how to tie 14 different cravats. Soon after, the immense skill required to tie the cravat in certain styles quickly became a mark of a man's elegance and wealth.  It was also the first book to use the word tie in association with neckwear.

It was about this time that black stocks made their appearance. Their popularity eclipsed the white cravat, except for formal and evening wear. These remained popular through the 1850s. At this time, another form of neckwear worn was the scarf. This was where a neckerchief or bandana was held in place by slipping the ends through a finger or scarf ring at the neck instead of using a knot. This is the classic sailor neckwear and may have been adopted from them.

1860s–1945: bow ties, scarf/neckerchief, the ascot, the long tie 

With the industrial revolution, more people wanted neckwear that was easy to put on, was comfortable and would last an entire workday. Neckties were designed to be long, thin, and easy to knot, without accidentally coming undone. This is the necktie design still worn by millions.

By this time, the sometimes complicated array of knots and styles of neckwear gave way to neckties and bow ties, the latter a much smaller, more convenient version of the cravat.  Another type of neckwear, the ascot tie, was considered de rigueur for male guests at formal dinners and male spectators at races. These ascots had wide flaps that were crossed and pinned together on the chest.

In 1922, a New York tie maker, Jesse Langsdorf, came up with a method of cutting the fabric on the bias and sewing it in three segments. This technique improved elasticity and facilitated the fabric's return to its original shape. Since that time, most men have worn the "Langsdorf" tie. Yet another development during that time was the method used to secure the lining and interlining once the tie had been folded into shape.

1945–present-day 

 
These loud, flamboyant ties sold very well through the 1950s.

Diagonal ("regimental or "repp") stripes are a common necktie pattern. In Britain and other Commonwealth countries, these have been used to denote association with a particular regiment, corps, or service since at least the 1920s, and are also used to represent civic and educational institutions. It is considered inappropriate for persons who are unaffiliated with a regiment, university, school, or other organization, to wear a necktie affiliated with that organization. In Commonwealth countries, necktie stripes run from the left shoulder down to the right side, but when Brooks Brothers introduced similar striped ties in the United States around the beginning of the 20th century, they had their stripes run from the right shoulder to the left side, in part to distinguish them from British regimental striped neckties. Members of the British Royal Family are frequently seen wearing regimental striped ties corresponding to the military unit in which they have served or been appointed to an honorary position such as colonel-in-chief.

Before the Second World War ties were worn shorter than they are today; this was due, in part, to men wearing trousers at the natural waist (just above the belly button), and also due to the popularity of waistcoats, where tie length is not important as long as the tips are concealed. Around 1944, ties started to become not only wider but even wilder. This was the beginning of what was later labeled the Bold Look: ties that reflected the returning GIs' desire to break with wartime uniformity. Widths reached , and designs included Art Deco, hunting scenes, scenic "photographs", tropical themes, and even girlie prints, though more traditional designs were also available.

The Bold Look lasted until about 1951 when the "Mister T" look (so termed by Esquire magazine) was introduced. The new style, characterized by tapered suits, slimmer lapels, and smaller hat brims, included thinner and not so wild ties. Through the 1950s, neckties remained somewhat colorful, yet more restrained than in the previous decade. Small geometric shapes were often employed against a solid background (i.e., foulards); diagonal stripes were also popular.

The 1960s brought about an influx of pop art influenced designs. The first was designed by Michael Fish when he worked at Turnbull & Asser, and was introduced in Britain in 1965; the term Kipper tie was a pun on his name, as well as a reference to the triangular shape of the front of the tie. The exuberance of the styles of the late 1960s and early 1970s gradually gave way to more restrained designs. Ties became wider, returning to their  width, sometimes with garish colors and designs. The traditional designs of the 1930s and 1950s, such as those produced by Tootal, reappeared, particularly Paisley patterns. Ties began to be sold along with shirts, and designers slowly began to experiment with bolder colors.

Into the 1990s, as ties got wider again, increasingly unusual designs became common. Novelty (or joke) ties or deliberately kitschy ties designed to make a statement gained a certain popularity in the 1980s and 1990s. These included ties featuring cartoon characters, commercial products, or pop culture icons, and those made of unusual materials, such as plastic or wood.

The standard length remains , though other lengths vary from 117 cm to 152 cm. In 2008 and 2009 the world of fashion saw a return to narrower ties.

Types

Cravat 
In 1660, in celebration of its hard-fought victory over the Ottoman Empire, a crack regiment from Croatia  visited Paris. There, the soldiers were presented as glorious heroes to Louis XIV, a monarch well known for his eye for personal adornment. It so happened that the officers of this regiment were wearing brightly colored handkerchiefs fashioned of silk around their necks. These neckcloths struck the fancy of the king, and he soon made them an insignia of royalty as he created a regiment of Royal Cravattes. The word "cravat" is derived from the à la croate—in the style of the Croats.

Four-in-hand 
The four-in-hand necktie (as distinct from the four-in-hand knot) was fashionable in Great Britain in the 1850s. Early neckties were simple, rectangular cloth strips cut on the square, with square ends.  The term "four-in-hand" originally described a carriage with four horses and a driver; later, it also was the name of a London gentlemen's club, The Four-in-Hand Driving Company founded in 1856. Some etymologic reports are that carriage drivers knotted their reins with a four-in-hand knot (see below), whilst others claim the carriage drivers wore their scarves knotted 'four-in-hand', but, most likely, members of the club began wearing their neckties so knotted, thus making it fashionable. In the latter half of the 19th century, the four-in-hand knot and the four-in-hand necktie were synonymous. As fashion changed from stiff shirt collars to soft, turned-down collars, the four-in-hand necktie knot gained popularity; its sartorial dominance rendered the term "four-in-hand" redundant usage, shortened "long tie" and "tie".

In 1926, Jesse Langsdorf from New York City introduced ties cut on the bias (US) or cross-grain (UK), allowing the tie to evenly fall from the knot without twisting; this also caused any woven pattern such as stripes to appear diagonally across the tie.

Today, four-in-hand ties are part of men's dress clothing in both Western and non-Western societies, particularly for business.

Four-in-hand ties are generally made from silk or polyester and occasionally with cotton.  Another material used is wool, usually knitted, common before World War II but not as popular nowadays. More recently, microfiber ties have also appeared; in the 1950s and 1960s, other manmade fabrics, such as Dacron and rayon, were also used, but have fallen into disfavor. Modern ties appear in a wide variety of colors and patterns, notably striped (usually diagonally); club ties (with a small motif repeated regularly all over the tie); foulards (with small geometric shapes on a solid background); paisleys; and solids.  Novelty ties featuring icons from popular culture (such as cartoons, actors, or holiday images), sometimes with flashing lights, have enjoyed some popularity since the 1980s.

Six- and seven-fold ties 
A seven-fold tie is an unlined construction variant of the four-in-hand necktie which pre-existed the use of interlining. Its creation at the end of the 19th century is attributed to the Parisian shirtmaker Washington Tremlett for an American customer. A seven-fold tie is constructed completely out of silk. A six-fold tie is a modern alteration of the seven-fold tie. This construction method is more symmetrical than the true seven-fold. It has an interlining which gives it a little more weight and is self-tipped.

Skinny tie 
A skinny tie is a necktie that is narrower than the standard tie and often all-black. Skinny ties were first popularized in the late 1950s and early 1960s by British bands such as the Beatles and the Kinks, alongside the subculture that embraced such bands, the mods. This is because clothes of the time evolved to become more form-fitting and tailored. They were later repopularized in the late 1970s and early 1980s by new wave and power pop bands such as the Knack, Blondie and Duran Duran.

"Pre-tied" ties and development of clip-ons 

The "pre-tied" necktie, or more commonly, the clip-on necktie, is a permanently knotted four-in-hand or bow tie affixed by a clip or hook. The clip-on tie sees use with children, and in occupations where a traditional necktie might pose a safety hazard to mechanical equipment operators, etc.

The perceived utility of this development in the history of the style is evidenced by the series of patents issued for various forms of these ties, beginning in the late 19th century, and by the businesses filing these applications and fulfilling a market need for them. For instance, a patent filed by Joseph W. Less of the One-In-Hand Tie Company of Clinton, Iowa for "Pre-tied neckties and methods for making the same" noted that:

The Inventor proceeded to claim for the invention—the latest version of the 1930s–1950s product line from former concert violinist Joseph Less, Iowan brothers Walter and Louis, and son-in-law W. Emmett Thiessen evolved to be identifiable as the modern clip-on—"a novel method for making up the tie ... [eliminating] the neckband of the tie, which is useless and uncomfortable in warm weather ... [and providing] means of attachment which is effective and provides no discomfort to the wearer", and in doing so achieves "accurate simulation of the Windsor knot, and extremely low material and labor costs". Notably, the company made use of ordinary ties purchased from the New York garment industry and was a significant employer of women in the pre-war and World War II years.

Knots 

There are four main knots used to knot neckties. In rising order of difficulty, they are:

 the four-in-hand knot. The four-in-hand knot may be the most common.
 the Pratt knot (the Shelby knot)
 the half-Windsor knot
 the Windsor knot (also redundantly called the "full Windsor" and the "Double Windsor").

Although he did not invent it, the Windsor knot is named after the Duke of Windsor. The Duke did favor a voluminous knot; however, he achieved this by having neckties specially made of thicker cloths.

In the late 1990s, two researchers, Thomas Fink and Yong Mao of Cambridge's Cavendish Laboratory, used mathematical modeling to discover that 85 knots are possible with a conventional tie (limiting the number "moves" used to tie the knot to nine; longer sequences of moves result in too large a knot or leave the hanging ends of the tie too short). The models were published in academic journals, while the results and the 85 knots were published in layman's terms in a book entitled The 85 Ways to Tie a Tie. Of the 85 knots, Fink and Mao selected 13 knots as "aesthetic" knots, using the qualities of symmetry and balance. Based on these mathematical principles, the researchers came up with not only the four necktie knots in common use, but nine more, some of which had seen limited use, and some that are believed to have been codified for the first time.

Other types of knots include:
 Small knot (also "oriental knot", "Kent knot"): the smallest possible necktie knot. It forms an equilateral triangle, like the half-Windsor, but much more compact (Fink–Mao notation: Lo Ri Co T, Knot 1). It is also the smallest knot to begin inside-out.
 Nicky knot: an alternative version of the Pratt knot, but better-balanced and self-releasing (Lo Ci Ro Li Co T, Knot 4). Supposedly named for Nikita Khrushchev, it tends to be equally referred to as the Pratt knot in men's style literature. This is the version of the Pratt knot favored by Fink and Mao.
 Atlantic knot: a reversed Pratt knot, highlighting the structure of the knot normally hidden on the back. For the wide blade to remain in front and right-side-out, the knot must begin right-side-out, and the thin end must be wrapped around the wide end. (Ri Co Ri Lo Ci T; not cataloged by Fink and Mao, but would be numbered 5r according to their classification.)
 Prince Albert knot (also "double knot", "cross Victoria knot"): A variant of the four-in-hand with an extra pass of the wide blade around the front, before passing the wide blade through both of the resultant loops (Li Ro Li Ro Li Co T T, Knot 62). A version knotted through only the outermost loop is known as the Victoria knot (Li Ro Li Ro Li Co T, Knot 6).
 Christensen knot (also "cross knot"): An elongated, symmetrical knot, whose main feature is the cruciform structure made by knotting the necktie through the double loop made in the front (Li Ro Ci Lo Ri Lo Ri Co T T, Knot 252). While it can be made with modern neckties, it is most effective with thinner ties of consistent width, which fell out of common use after the 19th century.
 Ediety knot (also "Merovingian knot"): a doubled Atlantic knot, best known as the tie knot worn by the character "the Merovingian" in the 2003 film The Matrix Reloaded. This tie can be knotted with the thin end over the wide end, as with the Atlantic knot, or with the wide end over the thin end to mimic the look seen in the film, with the narrow blade in front. (Ri Co Ri Lo Ci Ri Co Ri Lo Ci T – not cataloged by Fink and Mao, as its 10 moves exceed their parameters.)
Victoria knot
Eldredge knot
Trinity knot
Tulip knot
Vidalia knot
Caped Eldredge knot 
Trinity-Eldredge knot
St.Andrew knot
Balthus knot
Hanover knot
Grantchester knot
Plattsburgh knot

Ties as a sign of membership 

The use of coloured and patterned neckties indicating the wearer's membership in a club, military regiment, school, professional association (Royal Colleges, Inns of Courts) et cetera, dates only from the late-19th century England. The immediate forerunners of today's college neckties were in 1880 the oarsmen of Exeter College, Oxford, who tied the bands of their straw hats around their necks.

In the United Kingdom and many Commonwealth countries, neckties are commonly an essential component of a school uniform and are either worn daily, seasonally or on special occasions with the school blazer. In Hong Kong, Australia and New Zealand, neckties are worn as the everyday uniform, usually as part of the winter uniform. In countries with no winter such as Sri Lanka, Singapore, Malaysia, and many African countries, the necktie is usually worn as part of the formal uniform on special occasions or functions. Neckties may also denote membership in a house or a leadership role (i.e. school prefect, house captain, etc.).

The most common pattern for such ties in the UK and most of Europe consists of diagonal stripes of alternating colors running down the tie from the wearer's left. Since neckties are cut on the bias (diagonally), the stripes on the cloth are parallel or perpendicular to the selvage, not diagonal. The colors themselves may be particularly significant. The dark blue and red regimental tie of the Household Division is said to represent the blue blood (i.e. nobility) of the Royal Family, and the red blood of the Guards.

In the United States, diagonally striped ties are commonly worn with no connotation of a group membership. Typically, American striped ties have the stripes running downward from the wearer's right (the opposite of the European style). (However, when Americans wear striped ties as a sign of membership, the European stripe style may be used.) In some cases, American "repp stripe" ties may simply be reverse images of British regimental ties.  Striped ties are strongly associated with the Ivy League and preppy style of dress. 

An alternative membership tie pattern to diagonal stripes is either a single emblem or a crest centered and placed where a tie pin normally would be, or a repeated pattern of such motifs. Sometimes, both types are used by an organization, either simply to offer a choice or to indicate a distinction among levels of membership. Occasionally, a hybrid design is used, in which alternating stripes of color are overlaid with repeated motif patterns.

Use by women and girls 
 
Neckties are sometimes part of uniforms worn by women, which nowadays might be required in professions such as in the restaurant industry or in police forces. In many countries, girls are nowadays required to wear ties as part of primary and secondary school uniforms.

Ties may also be used by women as a fashion statement. During the late 1970s and 1980s, it was not uncommon for young women in the United States to wear ties as part of a casual outfit. This trend was popularized by Diane Keaton who wore a tie as the titular character in Annie Hall in 1977.

In 1993, neckties reappeared as prominent fashion accessories for women in both Europe and the U.S. Canadian recording artist Avril Lavigne wore neckties with tank tops early in her career.

Occasions for neckties 
Traditionally, ties are a staple of office attire, especially for professionals. Proponents of the tie's place in the office assert that ties neatly demarcate work and leisure time.

The theory is that the physical presence of something around your neck serves as a reminder to knuckle down and focus on the job at hand. Conversely, loosening the tie after work signals that one can relax.

Outside of these environments, ties are usually worn especially when attending traditionally formal or professional events, including weddings, important religious ceremonies, funerals, job interviews, court appearances, and fine dining.

Opposition to neckties 
The debate between proponents and opponents of the necktie center on social conformity, plainness, professional expectation, and personal, sartorial expression.  Quoting architect Louis Sullivan, Frank Lloyd Wright said: "Form follows function". Applied sartorially, the necktie's decorative function is so criticized.

Christian denominations teaching plain dress 
Among many Christian denominations teaching the doctrine of plain dress, long neckties are not worn by men; this includes many Anabaptist communities (such as the Conservative Mennonite churches), traditional Quakers (who view neckties as contravening their testimony of simplicity), and some Holiness Methodists (such as the Reformed Free Methodists who view neckties as conflicting with the belief in outward holiness).

Other Holiness Methodist denominations, such as the Evangelical Wesleyan Church, allow a long necktie that is black. While Reformed Mennonites, among some other Anabaptist communities, reject the long necktie, the wearing of the bow tie is customary.

Anti-necktie sentiment 

In the early 20th century, the number of office workers began increasing. Many such men and women were required to wear neckties because it was perceived as improving work attitudes, morale, and sales.
Removing the necktie as a social and sartorial business requirement (and sometimes forbidding it) is a modern trend often attributed to the rise of popular culture.  Although it was common as everyday wear as late as 1966, over the years 1967–69, the necktie fell out of fashion almost everywhere, except where required. There was a resurgence in the 1980s, but in the 1990s, ties again fell out of favor, with many technology-based companies having casual dress requirements, including Apple, Amazon, eBay, Genentech, Microsoft, Monsanto, and Google.

In western business culture, a phenomenon known as Casual Friday has arisen, in which employees are not required to wear ties on Fridays, and then—increasingly—on other, announced, special days. Some businesses have extended casual dress days to Thursday, and even Wednesday; others require neckties only on Monday (to start the workweek).  At the furniture company IKEA, neckties are not allowed.

An example of anti-necktie sentiment is found in Iran, where the government of the Islamic Republic considers neckties to be "decadent, un-Islamic and viewed as "symbols of the Cross" and the oppressive West." To date, most Iranian men in Iran have retained the Western-style long-sleeved collared shirt and three-piece suit, while excluding the necktie. While ties are viewed as "highly politicised clothing" in Iran, some Iranian men continue to wear them, as do many Westerners who visit the country.

Neckties are viewed by various sub- and counter-culture movements as being a symbol of submission and slavery (i.e., having a symbolic chain around one's neck) to the corrupt elite of society, as a "wage slave".

For 60 years, designers and manufacturers of neckties in the United States were members of the Men's Dress Furnishings Association but the trade group shut down in 2008 as a result of declining membership due to the declining numbers of men wearing neckties.

In 2019, US presidential candidate Andrew Yang drew attention when he appeared on televised presidential debates without a tie. Yang dismissed media questions about it, saying that voters should be focused on more important issues.

New Zealand Member of Parliament Rawiri Waititi has been vocal in his opposition to neckties, calling them a "colonial noose". In February 2021, he was ejected from Parliament for refusing to wear a tie, drawing attention and parliamentary debate, which ultimately resulted in the requirement being dropped from NZ parliament's appropriate business attire requirements for males.

Richard Branson, founder of Virgin Group, believes ties are a symbol of oppression and slavery.

Tyrone Blade, the marketing department manager of Henry Bucks, a men's clothing store in Australia, said that neckties continue to be a well-sold item at his store, but stated that the reason men were buying them has changed. He described the necktie as "more of a 'want' item instead of a 'need' item".

Health and safety hazards 

Necktie wearing presents some risks for entanglement, infection, and vasoconstriction. A 2018 study published in the medical journal Neuroradiology found that a Windsor knot tightened to the point of "slight discomfort" could interrupt as much as 7.5 percent of cerebral blood flow.  A 2013 study published in the British Journal of Ophthalmology found increased intraocular pressure in such cases, which can aggravate the condition of people with weakened retinas.  There may be additional risks for people with glaucoma.

Entanglement is a risk when working with machinery or in dangerous, possibly violent, jobs such as police officers and prison guards, and certain medical fields.

Paramedics performing life support remove an injured man's necktie as a first step to ensure it does not block his airway. Neckties might also be a health risk for persons other than the wearer. They are believed to be vectors of disease transmission in hospitals. Notwithstanding such fears, many doctors and dentists wear neckties for a professional image. Hospitals take seriously the cross-infection of patients by doctors wearing infected neckties, because neckties are less frequently cleaned than most other clothes. On September 17, 2007, British hospitals published rules banning neckties. In such a context, some instead prefer to use bow ties due to their short length and relative lack of hindrance.

Police officers, traffic wardens, and security guards in the UK wear clip-on ties which instantly unclip when pulled to prevent any risk of strangulation during a confrontation. They are part of the National Framework Contract for the police uniform.

See also 

Ascot tie
Bolo tie 
 Bow tie
Cravat
 History of Western fashion
 Panama hat
 Prince Claus of the Netherlands and the "Declaration of the Tie"
 Knit Tie
 School tie
 Tie chain
 Tie clip
 Tie press, a device used to combat creasing in ties without heat-related damage.

References

Further reading

External links 

 

 
Articles containing video clips
Croatian inventions
History of clothing (Western fashion)
Neckwear
Textile industry in Croatia